William Sutton was a North East (of England) songwriter/poet of the eighteenth/nineteenth century, possibly born (or living) in Stockton.

According to (Sir) Cuthbert Sharp in his The Bishoprick Garland William Sutton wrote : -
in praise of Stockton, for 1764 - which also appears in Ritson’s book “Bishopric Garlands” 
a new song for 1764 - which also appears in Rhymes of Northern Bards by John Bell (junior).

See also 
Geordie dialect words
Cuthbert Sharp
The Bishoprick Garland 1834 by Sharp
Rhymes of Northern Bards
John Bell (junior)

References

External links
 The Bishoprick Garland 1834 by (Sir) Cuthbert Sharp page 63 & 64
  Rhymes of Northern Bards by John Bell Jnr

English male poets
English songwriters
People from Stockton-on-Tees
Geordie songwriters